Admiral Ramón Castro Jijón (15 November 1915 – 1 November 1984) was President of Ecuador 11 July 1963 to 29 March 1966. He was appointed commander of the Ecuadorian Navy by Carlos Julio Arosemena Monroy, whom he later overthrew in a coup.  For his entire term as President he was chairman of a military junta.

External links
 Official Website of the Ecuadorian Government about the country President's History

1915 births
1984 deaths
People from Esmeraldas, Ecuador
Ecuadorian people of Galician descent
Presidents of Ecuador
Leaders who took power by coup
Leaders ousted by a coup